Mopalia hindsii is a species of medium-sized chiton that grows up to 7 cm long. Most commonly found in intertidal zones, M. hindsii  has a white ventral side unlike most intertidal chitons that are orange underneath.

Range
Mopalia hindsii have been observed from South California north to Alaska.

Habitat
Mopalia hindsii are most common in protected environments like shallow bays, underneath rocks and on shaded pilings.

Diet
While most chitons are herbivores, M. hindsii will graze on just about anything in its path that doesn’t escape including polychaetes, amphipods, barnacles, sponges and algae. This uncommon lifestyle most likely explains why M. hindsii are able to survive in areas too silty for other chitons.

References 
 Kozloff, Eugene N. Marine Invertebrates of the Pacific Northwest. Seattle, WA: University of Washington Press, 1996.
 Lamb, Andy, and Hanby, Bernard P. Marine Life of the Pacific Northwest. Madeira Park, BC: Harbour Publishing, 2005.
 Kozloff, Eugene N. Seashore Life of the Northern Pacific Coast. Seattle, WA: University of Washington Press, 1973.

Mopaliidae
Chitons described in 1847